The Crimean-Circassian Wars of 1539–1547 refers to a series of military conflicts between the Crimean Khanate and the Kabardian Principality.

History 
In 1539, 1545, 1546 and 1547, the Crimean Khan Sahib I Giray attacked Circassia. The Khan met with the leader of the Circassian tribe Zhaney, Kansavuk, who accepted to pay tribute. When leaving, on his way back collected, the khan collected slaves from villages.

In 1542, after Kansavuk, could not supply enough slaves, the khan decided to attack again. Kansavuk's message with promises was rejected, and the Crimeans entered Circassia. In a night battle, attacked by the Circassians, the Tatars win and left with slaves.

References 

16th-century conflicts
16th century in the Crimean Khanate
Wars involving the Circassians
Military operations involving the Crimean Khanate